2003 World Cup may refer to:

 2003 Alpine Skiing World Cup
 2003 Cricket World Cup
 2003 FIFA Women's World Cup
 2003 FIVB Women's World Cup
 2003 IFAF World Championship, an American football championship
 2003 Rugby World Cup
 2003 Speedway World Cup

See also
 2003 Continental Championships (disambiguation)
 2003 World Championships (disambiguation)
 2003 World Junior Championships (disambiguation)